Shahabi is a village in Fars Province, Iran.

Shahabi may also refer to:

 Shahabi (surname)
 Khvor-e Shahabi, village in Bushehr Province, Iran

See also
 Shahab (disambiguation)